Robert Lee Hall III, known as Bob Hall (born March 5, 1942), is an American politician who is a Republican member of the Texas State Senate. Aligned with the Tea Party movement, he succeeded fellow Republican Bob Deuell, whom he unseated by three hundred votes in the Republican  runoff election held on May 27, 2014.

Early life and education

Hall graduated in 1960 from George D. Chamberlain High School in Tampa, Florida. In 1964, Hall received a Bachelor of Science degree in electrical engineering from The Citadel.

Political career
Hall ran against incumbent State Senator Bob Deuell in 2012 but failed to meet constitutional residency requirements. He ran again in 2014. He unseated Deuell in a Republican primary runoff election, 18,230 votes (50.4 percent) to 17,930 (49.6 percent). Hall defeated Libertarian Party nominee, Don Bates, in the November 4 general election.

In the 2018 Republican primary, Hall was challenged by state representative Cindy Burkett, who ran as a politically moderate alternative to him. Hall defeated her in the March 6, 2018, primary election. Hall won his second state Senate term in the general election held on November 6, 2018. With 152,659 votes (59.4 percent), he defeated Kendall Scudder, who finished with 104,528 (40.6 percent).

In 2019, Hall became chairman of the Agriculture committee.

During the COVID-19 pandemic, Hall promoted misinformation about COVID-19 and vaccines, including the debunked conspiracy theory that COVID-19 vaccines skipped animal testing. He encouraged people to not take the vaccine.

Personal life
Hall and his wife, the former Sarah Kay Smith, a native of Commerce in Hunt County in East Texas, live in Tailwind Airpark in Edgewood, a community for pilots and aviation enthusiasts which has its own runway and hangars. The couple is Southern Baptist and has three adult sons.

Electoral history

References

External links
 Bob Hall's Texas Senate page
 Official website
 Bob Hall at the Texas Tribune
 Bob Hall at Ballotpedia

1942 births
Engineers from Virginia
Baptists from Texas
Businesspeople from Tampa, Florida
Businesspeople from Texas
George D. Chamberlain High School alumni
Living people
People from Fairfax County, Virginia
People from Mesquite, Texas
People from Okaloosa County, Florida
People from Santa Rosa County, Florida
People from Seneca County, Ohio
People from Shenandoah County, Virginia
People from Edgewood, Texas
People from York County, Pennsylvania
Tea Party movement activists
Republican Party Texas state senators
The Citadel, The Military College of South Carolina alumni
United States Air Force officers
Activists from Ohio
Activists from Texas
21st-century American politicians
People from Commerce, Texas
Engineers from Pennsylvania
Engineers from Ohio
Baptists from Virginia
Military personnel from Texas
Military personnel from Pennsylvania